Metropolitan Miami is a mixed-use development consisting of three completed skyscrapers, a fourth uncompleted building, and a lifestyle center in the central business district of Downtown Miami, Florida. The first phase was completed in 2008 with Met 1, a condo tower, and was followed by Met 2 – which includes the Wells Fargo Center and JW Marriott Marquis Miami – in 2010. The third phase of the complex, Met 3 and Met Square, was completed in 2014.

The Met Square site (between Met 1 and the Wells Fargo Center), was originally planned to house a movie theatre, restaurants, and a 31-story hotel tower, however, ongoing archaeological digs have found important Tequesta Indian ruins. The ruins date back 2,000 years and include over eight large circles carved into the ground's limestone. These circles are believed to be Tequesta Indian dwellings, and part of a larger Tequesta Indian settlement believed to be one of the largest in North America. As of February 2014, the Met Square site is now being considered for a National Historic Landmark status, and possibly UNESCO designation. The future of the Met Square development was uncertain given these findings; however, in a landmark mediation process between public and private entities, the developers worked with archaeologists and government officials to protect partial or all of the site by building around it including a glass floor among other things with the idea to make it a museum. However, not all preservationists were happy with outcome.

Both towers would also surpass the incumbent Four Seasons Hotel Miami. However, the taller design was canceled in the subprime mortgage crisis.

The project gained significant attention due to NBA star Shaquille O'Neal's involvement, by forming The O'Neal Group as a joint-venture with M.D.M. Development Group. The site where Metropolitan Miami is being developed was formerly surface parking when the Royal Palm Hotel and grounds were destroyed in 1930.

The project was designed by Coral Gables-based architecture firm Nichols Brosch Wurst Wolfe & Associates, Inc.

Gallery

See also
Met 1
JW Marriott Marquis Miami
Wells Fargo Center (Miami)
Met 3
List of tallest buildings in Miami

References

External links
Metropolitan Miami official website
Emporis - Metropolitan Miami

Residential condominiums in Miami
Hotels in Miami
Office buildings in Miami
Tequesta
Archaeological sites in Florida